Richard McCallum (born 24 April 1984) is a Jamaican international footballer who plays for Waterhouse, as a goalkeeper.

Career

Club 
McCallum has played club football for Wadadah, Invaders United and Waterhouse. McCallum was named CHEC Player of the Month for April 2014.

International 
He made his international debut for Jamaica in 2006. McCallum has also featured for Jamaica at under-17, under-20 and under-23 levels.

References

1984 births
Living people
Jamaican footballers
Jamaica international footballers
Association football goalkeepers